Siegfried Schneider may refer to:

Siegfried Schneider (volleyball) (born 1939), German Olympic volleyball player
Siegfried Schneider (politician) (born 1956), German politician